The CPLP Games is a multinational multi-sport event organized by the Community of Portuguese Language Countries (CPLP), which involves athletes coming from Lusophone (Portuguese-speaking) countries that are less than 16 years old.

This event is similar in concept to the Lusophone Games, but for younger athletes.

Editions

Medal table

Medal table details

Participating nations
In the first edition, the nations that have participated are as follows:
 
 
 
 
 
 

In Maputo 1997, Brazil entered the competition, but in Praia 2002 it did not participate.
Luanda 2005 saw the return of Brazil.

In 2008, the CPLP Games saw all the possible participating nations competing in Rio de Janeiro, after East Timor participated for the first time, plus Macau (PR China) that was invited to be present.

Sports
So far there are not any regulations concerning the list of sports that should be included in the Games schedule.
However, in the 2008 edition the sports were:

Athletics
Basketball
Beach volleyball
Disabled athletic
Football
Handball
Tennis

It is expected in next editions of this games, the inclusion of roller hockey (quad), a sport so relevant and associated to Lusophone world.

See also
CPLP
ACOLOP
Lusophone Games
CUCSA games (1996-2022) Involve ten southern African nations

References

Contribuem para união da comunidade - dirigente português

External links
Official website of VIII CPLP Games

Multi-sport events
Community of Portuguese Language Countries
Recurring sporting events established in 1992
Youth sports competitions